Hans Thomas Fogdö (born 14 March 1970) is a Swedish former alpine skier.

A slalom specialist, he won the World Cup for that discipline in 1993.

On 7 February 1995 he became disabled after breaking his spine in a training accident at Åre, Sweden. Today he works for various sponsor projects and for the Swedish Ski Association.

World Cup victories

References

External links
 

1970 births
Swedish male alpine skiers
Alpine skiers at the 1992 Winter Olympics
Alpine skiers at the 1994 Winter Olympics
FIS Alpine Ski World Cup champions
Swedish people with disabilities
People from Gällivare Municipality
Living people
Sportspeople from Norrbotten County